Cole Davis (born 6 July 1997) is a Canadian rugby union player, currently playing for the Austin Gilgronis of Major League Rugby (MLR) and the Canadian national team. His preferred position is wing.

Professional career
Davis signed for Major League Rugby side Austin Gilgronis ahead of the 2021 Major League Rugby season. Davis made his debut for Canada in the 2018 Americas Rugby Championship. He also represented Canada Sevens in 2019.

Career statistics

References

External links
itsrugby.co.uk Profile

1997 births
Living people
Canadian rugby union players
Canada international rugby union players
Rugby union wings
Austin Gilgronis players
Rugby ATL players
Toronto Arrows players